Stoneman is a surname. Notable people with the surname include:

 Augustus Stoneman (1832–1905), Canadian merchant and political figure
 Bertha Stoneman (1866–1943), American born South African botanist
 Bill Stoneman (born 1944), former American pitcher in Major League Baseball
 Dean Stoneman (born 1990), British racing driver
 Dorothy Stoneman  (born c. 1942), American founder and president of YouthBuild USA
 Emma Stoneman (born 1991), New Zealand water polo player
 Ernest Stoneman (1893–1968), American recording artist of country music's first commercial decade
 Ethel Stoneman (1890–1973), Australian psychologist
 George Stoneman (1822–1894), American army officer, Union cavalry general, and Governor of California
 Kate Stoneman (1841–1925), American suffragist and lawyer
 Marjory Stoneman
 Mark Stoneman (born 1987), English cricketer
 Mark Stoneman (politician) (born 1939), Australian politician
 Paul Stoneman (born 1973), English footballer
 Roni Stoneman (born 1938), American bluegrass banjo player
 Scotty Stoneman (1932–1973), American bluegrass and country fiddler
 Stuart Stoneman (born 1971), English cricketer                                                                                                                                                     
 Walter Stoneman (1876–1958), British portrait photographer

See also
 Stoneman
 Steinman